Jason Norville (born 9 September 1983) is a Trinidadian former professional footballer who played as a striker. He made one appearance for the Trinidad and Tobago national team in 2003.

Career
Norville came up through Watford's academy, and made 14 league appearances and scored his first professional goal in a 2–2 draw with Sheffield Wednesday in March 2003.

He moved to Barnet on 29 July 2005. His time at Barnet was marked by injuries, which restricted him to only 28 appearances in two years. He was released by the club in May 2007 but re-joined the club on a non-contract basis just before the start of the new season, however this was not officially announced until 31 August, after he had played three games for Wealdstone on loan to gain match fitness. He quickly fell out of favour at Barnet in the 2007–08 season after some poor performances and in January 2008 joined Woking on a free transfer. He was released at the end of the season. Norville was out of football for two years before going on trial at Gillingham in summer 2010, and joined Dover Athletic later that year.

References

External links

1983 births
Living people
Trinidad and Tobago footballers
Association football forwards
Trinidad and Tobago international footballers
English Football League players
National League (English football) players
Isthmian League players
Southern Football League players
Watford F.C. players
Barnet F.C. players
Welwyn Garden City F.C. players
Wealdstone F.C. players
Woking F.C. players
Dover Athletic F.C. players
Bishop's Stortford F.C. players
Trinidad and Tobago expatriate footballers
Trinidad and Tobago expatriate sportspeople in England
Expatriate footballers in England